Washington Township, Ohio may refer to:
Washington Township, Auglaize County, Ohio
Washington Township, Belmont County, Ohio
Washington Township, Brown County, Ohio
Washington Township, Carroll County, Ohio
Washington Township, Clermont County, Ohio
Washington Township, Clinton County, Ohio
Washington Township, Columbiana County, Ohio
Washington Township, Coshocton County, Ohio
Washington Township, Darke County, Ohio
Washington Township, Defiance County, Ohio
Washington Township, Franklin County, Ohio
Washington Township, Guernsey County, Ohio
Washington Township, Hancock County, Ohio
Washington Township, Hardin County, Ohio
Washington Township, Harrison County, Ohio
Washington Township, Henry County, Ohio
Washington Township, Highland County, Ohio
Washington Township, Hocking County, Ohio
Washington Township, Holmes County, Ohio
Washington Township, Jackson County, Ohio
Washington Township, Lawrence County, Ohio
Washington Township, Licking County, Ohio
Washington Township, Logan County, Ohio
Washington Township, Lucas County, Ohio
Washington Township, Mercer County, Ohio
Washington Township, Miami County, Ohio
Washington Township, Monroe County, Ohio
Washington Township, Montgomery County, Ohio
Washington Township, Morrow County, Ohio
Washington Township, Muskingum County, Ohio
Washington Township, Paulding County, Ohio
Washington Township, Pickaway County, Ohio
Washington Township, Preble County, Ohio
Washington Township, Richland County, Ohio
Washington Township, Sandusky County, Ohio
Washington Township, Scioto County, Ohio
Washington Township, Shelby County, Ohio
Washington Township, Stark County, Ohio
Washington Township, Tuscarawas County, Ohio
Washington Township, Union County, Ohio
Washington Township, Van Wert County, Ohio
Washington Township, Warren County, Ohio
Washington Township, Wood County, Ohio

Ohio township disambiguation pages